The 2014 NCAA Division II women's basketball tournament was the 33rd annual tournament hosted by the NCAA to determine the national champion of Division II women's  collegiate basketball in the United States.

Bentley defeated West Texas A&M in the championship game, 73–65, to claim the Falcons' first NCAA Division II national title.

The championship rounds were contested at the Erie Insurance Arena in Erie, Pennsylvania.

Regionals

South Central - Canyon, Texas
Location: First United Bank Center Host: West Texas A&M University

Southeast - Hickory, North Carolina
Location: Shuford Memorial Gymnasium Host: Lenoir-Rhyne College

South - Davie, Florida
Location: University Center Host: Nova Southeastern University

Central - Emporia, Kansas
Location: White Auditorium Host: Emporia State University

West - Pomona, California
Location: Kellogg Gymnasium Host: California State Polytechnic University, Pomona

Atlantic - Glenville, West Virginia
Location: Jesse R. Lilly, Jr. Gymnasium Host: Glenville State College

East - Waltham, Massachusetts
Location: Dana Center Host: Bentley College

Midwest - Springfield, Missouri
Location: Weiser Gymnasium Host: Drury University

Elite Eight - Erie, Pennsylvania
Location: Erie Insurance Arena Host: Gannon University

All-tournament team
 Jacqui Brugliera, Bentley
 Lauren Battista, Bentley
 Courtney Finn, Bentley
 Chontiquah White, West Texas A&M
 Jade Blackwell, Cal Poly Pomona

See also
 2014 NCAA Division I women's basketball tournament
 2014 NCAA Division III women's basketball tournament
 2014 NAIA Division I women's basketball tournament
 2014 NAIA Division II women's basketball tournament
 2014 NCAA Division II men's basketball tournament

References
 2014 NCAA Division II women's basketball tournament jonfmorse.com

 
NCAA Division II women's basketball tournament
2014 in Pennsylvania